The El Jume Formation is an Early Cretaceous geologic formation in Argentina. Indeterminate fossil dinosaur tracks have been reported from the formation. The formation, belonging to the El Gigante Group, overlies the Los Riscos Formation and is overlain by the El Toscal Formation. The sandstones and claystones of the formation were deposited in a fluvial environment. Part of the formation was assigned to a new formation, Balde de Leyes Formation in 2015.

See also 
 List of dinosaur-bearing rock formations
 List of stratigraphic units with dinosaur tracks
 Indeterminate dinosaur tracks
 Lagarcito Formation
 La Cruz Formation
 Quebrada del Barro Formation

References

Bibliography 
 
 
 Weishampel, David B.; Dodson, Peter; and Osmólska, Halszka (eds.): The Dinosauria, 2nd, Berkeley: University of California Press. 861 pp. .

Geologic formations of Argentina
Lower Cretaceous Series of South America
Cretaceous Argentina
Sandstone formations
Shale formations
Fluvial deposits
Ichnofossiliferous formations
Fossiliferous stratigraphic units of South America
Paleontology in Argentina
Geology of San Luis Province